The Niagara Purchase  was an agreement between certain Mississauga peoples and the British crown signed in 1781. Under this agreement, the Mississaugas "grant, bargain, sell, release and confirm to our said Sovereign Lord King George the third" a tract of land bordered on the north by Lake Ontario, on the south by Lake Erie, and on the east by the Niagara River and extending six-and-a-half kilometres to the west. The Mississaugas accepted 300 suits of clothing as payment.

References 

First Nations history in Ontario
Aboriginal title in Canada
Regions of Canada
Mississauga First Nation
1781 treaties
1781 in Canada
History of Ontario by location